Devilish Charm is a 2018 South Korean television series starring Choi Jin-hyuk, Song Ha-yoon, Lee Ho-won and Lee Joo-yeon. It aired on Wednesdays and Thursdays at 23:00 (KST) time slot of MBN and Dramax from September 5 to October 25, 2018, for 16 episodes.

Synopsis
The strange but beautiful love story of a genius doctor who suffers from "Cinderella Memory Disorder" in which the memories of the previous day disappear at twelve o'clock and a washed-up actress.

Cast

Main
 Choi Jin-hyuk as Gong Ma-seong (34 years old), the successor of Sunwoo Group is a doctor and chief of a cranial nerve center. After a car accident when he tries to help a woman who he happens to meet, he suffers from short-term amnesia and his memory does not last more than a day.
 Choi Seung-hoon as young Gong Ma-seong
 Song Ha-yoon as Ju Gi-ppeum (30 years old), a top actress who falls off from grace due to a false charge.
 Lee Ho-won as Sung Ki-joon (31 years old), Ma-seong's younger cousin who is an entertainer whose dream is becoming a Hallyu star. He is the second in line heir to Sunwoo Group but is not interested in business.
 Seo Yoon-hyuk as young Sung Ki-joon
 Lee Joo-yeon as Lee Ha-im (34 years old), an ambitious A-list actress who is the only child of a rich family.

Supporting
 Lee Soo-ji as Go Nan-ju, Gi-ppeum's former stylist.
 Kim Min-sang as Dr. Yoon, Ma-seong's doctor.
 Jung Soo-gyo as Kim Beom-soo, the current representative of Ha-im from her agency.
 Kang Yoon-je as Ju Ja-rang, Gi-ppeum's brother.
 Kim Ji-young as Ju Sa-rang, Gi-ppeum's sister.
 Oh Kwang-rok as Ju Man-sik, Gi-ppeum's father.
 Jung Ae-hwa
 Jang In-sub as Yang Woo-jin	
 Jeon Soo-kyeong as Gong Jin-yang, Ma-seong's aunt.

Special appearances
 Lee Jung-hyuk as Min Hyung-joon
 Kwon Hyuk-soo as an internet program director
 Ahn Se-ha as Myung Seok-hwan
 Park Soo-ah as Kang Song-hwa

Production
Filming started in May 2018 and was fully pre-produced before its premiere.

Controversy
In October 2018, reports revealed the unpaid wages issue of actors and some staff members. The series' production company Golden Thumb Pictures commented on an official statement that all payments would be settled by the end of November. However, in December, it was reported that not all of the cast members had been paid yet, including lead actresses Song Ha-yoon and Lee Joo-yeon. Golden Thumb Pictures then promised to pay everyone by December 31.

On January 2, 2019, actress Song Ha-yoon's agency JYP Entertainment shared their plans on taking all possible legal action including civil and criminal lawsuits against the parties affiliated with the unpaid wages for Devilish Charm, as they had yet to receive their full payments. Broadcasting company iHQ remarked that the issue has to be settled by Golden Thumb Pictures as the wages were contracted between them and the actors.

Notes

References

External links
  (Dramax) 
 Official website (MBN) 
 
 

Maeil Broadcasting Network television dramas
Korean-language television shows
2018 South Korean television series debuts
2018 South Korean television series endings
South Korean romance television series
South Korean romantic comedy television series
South Korean pre-produced television series